Badri Pandey (born 4 March 1980) is a Nepali songwriter, producer, and music composer. He is mostly known as B. Pandey, a versatile lyricist of the Nepali music industry. He has written more than 150 songs of different genres. He began his career with his first song "Shankha Nagara" in 2001. The song was voiced by Rajesh Payal Rai and Binaya Niroula.

Early life
Badri Pandey was born and bred in the Nuwakot District of Nepal. His Father is Nim Prasad Pandey and his mother is Batumaya Pandey. He attended Dupeshwor Higher Secondary School. He was a decent student and was adored for his passion for music. He started writing songs and performing in the annual function of the school from a very early age.

Career
Pandey wrote and recorded "Shankha Nagara" in the voice of Rajesh Payal Rai and Binaya Niroula in 2001 after he came to Kathmandu on completion of his high school. Instantly he was given opportunities to write new songs for movies.

He was given the opportunity to write songs for the album Pancha Ratna. Pancha Ratna was considered a music jewel for its uniqueness. It also marked the debut of Pancha Ratna Music and Melody in the Nepalese music industry. It was a unique album in the sense that it contained a set of four audio CDs and a VCD. Each audio CD contained 8 songs while the VCD contained music videos of eight most loved songs by the audience.

Of the 32 songs in Pancha Ratna, Chandra Dong wrote three songs, Buddhabir Lama wrote two and Sangeeta Rai and Ram Kumar Adhikari had a song each to their credit. The rest of the 25 songs were written by B. Pandey.

The music composer in the album included Pravin Baraily, Suresh Adhikari, Narendra Pyasi, Chandra Dong, Uday Sotang, Raju Singh, Raj Sagar, Shishir Yogi, Deep Chandra Moktan, and Chitra Lal Sharma.

Likewise, The singers are Ram Krishna Dhakal, Jagadis Samal, Shailesh Singh, Madavi Tripath, Anju Panta, Narendra Pyasi, Thupten Bhutiya, Reema Gurung, Suresh Manandhar, Anjana, Uday, and Manila Sotang, Purna Pariyar, Manoj Rai, Ram Kumar Adhikari, Sangeeta Rai, Swaroop Raj Acharya, Deepak Limbu, Shishir Yogi, Rajesh Payal Rai, and Mani Kumar Rai.

After the success of Pancha Ratna, Pandey wrote songs for various movies. In 2018, he was given the opportunity to write a song for the Prasad movie. He wrote, "Banki Chari" which was a massive hit. He was able to bag the best lyricist of the year award with this song.
Aside from this, Pandey has been contributing to Nepali Music Industry as the chairman of the Music Producer Association of Nepal since 10 November 2019. Pandey was also appointed as General Secretary of Music Royalty Collection Society of Nepal (MRCSN) after the general meeting held on 22 September 2021.

Awards and recognition

References

Living people
1980 births
People from Nuwakot District
Nepalese songwriters
Nepalese composers